Árpád Weisz (also spelt Veisz; 16 April 1896 – 31 January 1944) was a Hungarian Olympic football player and manager. Weisz was Jewish, and was murdered with his wife and children by the Nazis during the Holocaust in World War II at Auschwitz.

Career

Playing career
Weisz played club football as a left winger in Hungary for Törekvés SE, in Czechoslovakia for Makabi Brno, and in Italy for Alessandria and Internazionale.

Weisz earned seven international caps between 1922 and 1923, and was a member of the Hungarian squad at the 1924 Summer Olympics in Paris. A serious injury cut short his playing career.

Coaching career
After retiring as a player in 1926, Weisz became an assistant coach at Alessandria before moving to F.C. Internazionale Milano, where at the age of 34 he won one championship in the 1929–1930 season. Weisz had three separate spells as manager of Inter, 1926–28, 1929–31, and 1932–34, managing Giuseppe Meazza among his players. He also coached Bari, Novara and Bologna, where he won two league titles (in 1936 and 1937) before he was forced to flee Italy with his wife and two children following the enactment of the Italian Racial Laws. Weisz finished his career by coaching FC Dordrecht in the Netherlands, leaving in 1940 following the outbreak of the Second World War.

Four years later he was arrested by the SS and murdered by the Nazis at Auschwitz concentration camp, with his family of four (including his wife Elena, his son Roberto, and his daughter Clara) when they were gassed immediately upon arriving at Birkenau.

Legacy
In January 2020, Chelsea FC unveiled a mural by Solomon Souza on an outside wall of the West Stand at Stamford Bridge stadium. The mural is part of Chelsea's 'Say No to Antisemitism' campaign funded by club owner Roman Abramovich. Included on the mural are depictions of footballers Julius Hirsch and Weisz, who were killed at Auschwitz concentration camp, and Ron Jones, a British prisoner of war known as the 'Goalkeeper of Auschwitz'.

References

External links
Jews In Sports
Hungarian Players and Coaches in Italy

1896 births
1944 deaths
Association football wingers
Hungarian footballers
Hungarian expatriate footballers
Jewish footballers
Jewish Hungarian sportspeople
Hungary international footballers
Olympic footballers of Hungary
Footballers at the 1924 Summer Olympics
Hungarian football managers
Inter Milan players
Inter Milan managers
S.S.C. Bari managers
FC Dordrecht managers
Hungarian expatriate sportspeople in Czechoslovakia
Hungarian expatriate sportspeople in Italy
Hungarian expatriate sportspeople in the Netherlands
Expatriate football managers in Italy
Expatriate football managers in the Netherlands
Hungarian people who died in Auschwitz concentration camp
Hungarian civilians killed in World War II
Sportspeople from Bács-Kiskun County
Expatriate footballers in Czechoslovakia
Hungarian Jews who died in the Holocaust